Sanquhar railway station is a railway station in the village of Sanquhar, Dumfries and Galloway, Scotland. The station is owned by Network Rail and managed by ScotRail and is on the Glasgow South Western Line. The old station buildings are in use as a holiday home.

Railway Mishap 1966 
On Sunday 14 August 1966, the previous evening's 22:10 Glasgow Central – London Euston consisting of five seating coaches, eight sleeping cars and two parcels vans hauled by EE Type 4 locomotive No. D311 crashed into a landslide between Sanquhar and Carrondale at 00:30. The loco and first ten coaches were derailed. None of the 270 passengers and four train crew were injured.

Services 
On Monday to Saturdays, there are 9 trains per day in each direction towards Dumfries (6 of these continue to Carlisle) and Glasgow Central running on a mostly 2 hourly frequency, however there can be gaps up to 4 hours at certain times of the day. On Sundays, there are 2 trains per day in each direction towards Carlisle and Glasgow.

See also
Mennock Lye Goods Depot

References

Sources

External links 

Railway stations in Dumfries and Galloway
Railway stations served by ScotRail
Railway stations in Great Britain opened in 1850
Railway stations in Great Britain closed in 1965
Railway stations in Great Britain opened in 1994
Beeching closures in Scotland
Former Glasgow and South Western Railway stations
Reopened railway stations in Great Britain
1850 establishments in Scotland
Sanquhar